ICG Enterprise Trust plc (formerly Graphite Enterprise Trust plc) is an investment company. It is listed on the London Stock Exchange and is a constituent of the FTSE 250 Index of the largest listed companies. In particular it is one of the largest investment trusts on the stock exchange with a market capitalisation of £579 million as at 13 March 2020.

Its objective is to provide shareholders with long-term capital growth through investment in unquoted companies, though private equity funds and also directly. The company was first listed in 1981 and has invested in private equity since its inception. It was managed by Graphite Capital, an independent private equity fund manager, and known as Graphite Enterprise Trust plc until February 2016, when Intermediate Capital Group took over management of the trust. It was then renamed ICG Enterprise Trust. The chairman is Jeremy Tigue.

References

Financial services companies established in 1981
Investment companies of the United Kingdom
Financial services companies based in the City of London
Companies listed on the London Stock Exchange